Living on Another Frequency is the debut album by American experimental metal band Science Faxtion, released on November 11, 2008 in the United States and January 26, 2009 in Europe.

Background 
The news on the album was given by bassist and vocalist Bootsy Collins, who gave an interview for Billboard in June 2007, saying:

In Rolling Stone Collins stated:

In an UGO.com interview with the band's singer about the origins of the band, Greg Hampton said:

Reception 
The release was met with mixed to positive reviews.

Track listing

Notes
 The song "At Any Cost" features parts of the song "Gigan" from the album The Elephant Man's Alarm Clock by Buckethead.
 The song "I See Rockets" features parts of the song "Lotus Island" from the album Inbred Mountain by Buckethead.

Personnel

Science Faxtion
Bootsy Collins – bass, guitar, drums, keyboards, synthesizer, vocals, programming, production, engineering
Greg Hampton – vocals, guitars, production
Buckethead – guitars
Brain – drums, programming
Tobe "Tobotius" Donohue – turntables, programming

Guest musicians
Chuck D – vocals on "What It Is"
Keith Cheatham – guitar
Chris Collier – drums
Steve Ferlazzo – synthesizer, piano, keyboards, vocals
Kyle Jason – vocals
Morris Mingo – keyboards
Paul Patterson – strings
Susan Peterson – strings
Bernie Worrell – synthesizer, keyboards
Brian Hardgroove – bass, drums, vocals, programming, engineering
Dan Monti – bass, programming, engineering

Additional personnel
Jeremy Mackenzie – engineering, digital editing
Don Woods – engineering

References

2008 albums
Science Faxtion albums